Marie Priscilla Martin Foster (October 24, 1917 – September 6, 2003) was a leader in the Civil Rights Movement in the U.S. during the 1960s. Her successful voter registration in Dallas County, Alabama fueled her to become an activist, and she began teaching adult classes to help people pass the required literacy tests. She was the Alabama foot soldier that convinced Martin Luther King Jr. to come to Selma, Alabama and helped organize the Selma to Montgomery marches in 1965. Her dedication gave her the moniker "The Mother of the Voting Rights Movement," which was shortened to Mother Foster.

Early Life and Work

Marie Foster was born Maria Priscilla Martin on October 24, 1917 near Alberta, Alabama in the Black Belt. Like the rest of the South, Wilcox County, Alabama was segregated, and educational opportunities were limited for Black students. Going against her husband's wishes, Foster's mother moved her and her siblings to Selma to ensure her children got the best education they could.

Though her siblings graduated, Foster dropped out after she met a man and got married. She had three children, whom she raised alone after her husband's death. Determined to finish her education and provide the best she could for her children, she went back to school, graduating a year after her daughter, Rose.

Foster then enrolled in a local junior college to become a dental hygienist. After completing her training, she worked for her brother, Dr. Sullivan Jackson in a local practice in Selma. Her dedication to education proved to be important as she fought against the Jim Crow system that denied Black voters from registering throughout the South.

Civil Rights Movement

Early Years of Voter Registration Activism 
Black voters in the South were subjected to unfair and racist practices by white registrars. Literacy tests and poll taxes prevented most voters at the offices because of the lack of equal pay and education. In some cases, those that attempted to register had their addresses published in the newspaper, which put them at risk of retaliation by whites, including violent attacks and termination of jobs.

Because Marie Foster worked for her brother, who owned his own dental practice, she did not face the high threat level this retaliation like many others would. She was not immune to it or ignored for her work, but her economic independence meant she could work for her right to vote. In 1961 in Dallas County, Alabama, roughly 156 Black people were registered to vote out of 15,000, and only 12 were new registrants since 1954.

Foster failed the voter registration test eight times before she finally passed and was granted her right to vote. From then on, she dedicated her life to the Civil Rights Movement: "I decided to become involved in the Civil Rights Movement because the race relations were so bad in Selma, I had a vision that we could do something about the bias conditions in Selma, the state, and someday the world."

Foster's education and experience with the literacy tests equipped her with critical skills in preparing other Black residents of the county to pass the test and register voters. She printed flyers inviting people to a literacy class, unsure of how many would come. Many residents feared the repercussions, others were unsure if the movement would be successful. Foster's first class had just one pupil - a 70 year old man who had never learned to read or write. Foster spent the time teaching him to write his name. Eventually, Foster's patience and knack for teaching spread throughout the area, and more and more people joined the classes to learn from her, trusting that she could help them without making them feel lesser than because they lacked a good education.

Work As A Movement Foot Soldier

Foster became interested in the Civil Rights Movement in the early 1960s because she felt "the race relations were so bad in Selma". She was part of the revival of the Dallas County Voters League, a group of African Americans that pushed for improvements in the system for voter registration and belonged to its eight-member steering committee, known as the "Courageous Eight".

Marches
As the Civil Rights Movement grew, Foster became an organizer for the Dallas County area. She participated in the march on March 7, 1965, that became known as Bloody Sunday. As the march approached the Edmund Pettus Bridge, a combined state trooper and police force stopped the march, violently beating many of the participants. Foster was at the front of one of the lines along with Amelia Boynton, and was clubbed by a state trooper, leaving her with swollen knees. Despite her injuries, two weeks later Foster participated in the march that eventually made it all the way to Montgomery, Alabama, successfully walking fifty miles over five days. She was one of the two women to complete it.

Martin Luther King, Jr. learned that Lyndon B. Johnson would sign the Voting Rights Act when he was at Foster's house. He is said to have cried at the news while with Foster.

Later life and legacy

After the Voting Rights Act was passed, Foster continued to work as a dental assistant. In 1984, Foster worked on Rev. Jesse Jackson's presidential campaign. In her free time, she taught children how to read. She carried on campaigning, fighting for public housing of the poor in Selma, conduct of white bus drivers or asking for the statue of the Klan founder to be taken away from a public park. She helped to found the National Voting Rights Museum and Institute. She fought many mayoral elections to replace the mayor of Selma Joseph Smitherman who was in office during the Selma to Montgomery marches.

She died on September 6, 2003. She is buried at Serenity Memorial Gardens in Selma, Alabama.

Foster was posthumously named an honoree by the National Women's History Alliance in 2020.

See also
 List of civil rights leaders
 National Voting Rights Museum in Selma, which has a room named for her.

References 

1917 births
2003 deaths
Activists for African-American civil rights
People from Wilcox County, Alabama
Activists from Selma, Alabama
African-American activists
Selma to Montgomery marches
Dental nurses
20th-century African-American women
20th-century African-American people
Women civil rights activists
21st-century African-American people
21st-century African-American women